Cyllene , also known as , is a natural satellite of Jupiter. It was discovered by a team of astronomers from the University of Hawaii led by Scott S. Sheppard in 2003, receiving the temporary designation .

Cyllene is about 2 kilometres in diameter, and orbits Jupiter at an average distance of (23.4 million km) 23,396,000 km in 731.099 days (2.00 earth years), at an inclination of 140.149° to the ecliptic (139.543° to Jupiter's equator), in a retrograde direction and with an eccentricity of 0.4116.

It was named in March 2005 after Cyllene, a naiad (stream nymph) or oread (mountain nymph) associated with Mount Cyllene, Greece. She was a daughter of Zeus (Jupiter).

It belongs to the Pasiphae group, irregular retrograde moons orbiting Jupiter at distances ranging between 22.8 and 24.1 Gm, and with inclinations ranging between 144.5° and 158.3°.

References

Pasiphae group
Moons of Jupiter
Irregular satellites
Discoveries by Scott S. Sheppard
Astronomical objects discovered in 2003
Moons with a retrograde orbit